Benjamín Medrano Quezada is a Mexican politician affiliated with the Institutional Revolutionary Party (PRI). He served as state congressman from 2010 to 2013 and, on 7 July 2013, he was elected municipal president of Fresnillo, the largest municipality in the state of Zacatecas.

According to press reports, he became the first openly gay citizen in the history of Mexico to be elected municipal president, being elected municipal president of Fresnillo, Zacatecas. He did not, however, became the first openly gay Mexican citizen to be elected to a political post, as the country has elected openly gay and lesbian congresspeople since 1997.

Biography
Born into a poor family with eleven siblings in Nochistlán, Zacatecas, Medrano toured both Mexico and the United States as a musician for María Victoria and Angélica María. 

Later, he graduated from the Autonomous University of Zacatecas with a bachelor's degree in Law and, at the age of 21, lead a local chapter of a trade union for professional musicians. Eventually, he became a businessman, recording several albums of ballads and ranchera music and establishing a gay nightclub around 1994.

He joined politics in 1995 as a city councilor in the state capital of Zacatecas City; three years later, he became an ally of Ricardo Monreal; an influential politician in the state who had quit the PRI to continue his career in several parties of the political left. Later, Medrano became chief adviser for governor Amalia García of the PRD. He joined the cabinet of David Monreal (a brother of Ricardo) in Fresnillo's city council. In 2010, he became a state deputy for the Labor Party (PT), but left the organization in 2011 when the party nominated someone else to run for federal deputy in his political district. He remained in the legislature and presided over the Finance Commission.

The Fresnillo area is a largely rural region with a high level of violent crimes related to the drug wars. The municipality covers some 258 villages that are, according to Medrano, "full of tough country people, who don't have much information about what is going on elsewhere..."

Medrano ran on a campaign of public safety against a smear campaign from his former party that focused on his homosexuality and alleged embezzlement of public funds. In his platform, he also promised to crack down on police corruption, restore security and gain control over the drug cartels. While Medrano is vocal about his homosexuality and has publicly defended transvestites' labor rights, he opposes same-sex marriage and adoption, LGBT pride parades, "flamboyant" homosexuality, gay prostitution and abortion. He was named president of the Commission for Attention to Rural Municipalities, part of the national organization of the National Federation of Municipalities of Mexico, A.C. (FENAMM).

In 2015, Medrano ran for and won a seat in the Chamber of Deputies for the LXIII Legislature of the Mexican Congress, representing the first district of Zacatecas based in Fresnillo. He serves on five commissions: a special commission for the Pueblos Mágicos, Radio and Television, Committee for the Center of Law Studies and Parliamentary Research, Federal District, and Constitutional Points. 

In October 2015, Medrano sought to leave the Chamber of Deputies for a year and finish his term as mayor of Fresnillo; ultimately, after negotiations between Medrano and officials in Zacatecas, he remained in the Chamber of Deputies and opted to permanently leave the municipal presidency of Fresnillo.

References

Living people
1966 births
21st-century Mexican politicians
Institutional Revolutionary Party politicians
Mexican LGBT politicians
Municipal presidents in Zacatecas
LGBT mayors
LGBT Roman Catholics
Members of the Chamber of Deputies (Mexico) for Zacatecas
LGBT legislators
Politicians from Zacatecas
People from Nochistlán
Autonomous University of Zacatecas alumni
Members of the Congress of Zacatecas
21st-century LGBT people
Deputies of the LXIII Legislature of Mexico